USS Houma may refer to:

, a tanker commissioned in January 1919 and serving until September 1919.
, a Natick-class tugboat serving from 1971 until 1999.

Houma